Hendrik Simangunsong (born 11 July 1969) is an Indonesian boxer. He competed at the 1992 Summer Olympics and the 1996 Summer Olympics.

References

External links
 

1969 births
Living people
Indonesian male boxers
Olympic boxers of Indonesia
Boxers at the 1992 Summer Olympics
Boxers at the 1996 Summer Olympics
Place of birth missing (living people)
Boxers at the 1990 Asian Games
Asian Games bronze medalists for Indonesia
Asian Games medalists in boxing
Medalists at the 1990 Asian Games
Light-middleweight boxers
20th-century Indonesian people
21st-century Indonesian people